Conus trochulus is a species of sea snail, a marine gastropod mollusk in the family Conidae, the cone snails and their relatives.

Like all species within the genus Conus, these snails are predatory and venomous. They are capable of "stinging" humans, therefore live ones should be handled carefully or not at all.

Description
The size of the shell varies between 18 mm and 50 mm. The shell is white, with usually a violet tinge. The interior of the aperture is light violet.

Distribution
This species occurs in the Atlantic Ocean off the islands of Boa Vista and Maio, Cape Verde. It is listed as near threatened by the IUCN.

References

 Tucker J.K. & Tenorio M.J. (2009) Systematic classification of Recent and fossil conoidean gastropods. Hackenheim: Conchbooks. 296 pp.

External links
 The Conus Biodiversity website
 Cone Shells – Knights of the Sea
 

trochulus
Gastropods described in 1844
Gastropods of Cape Verde
Endemic fauna of Cape Verde
Fauna of Boa Vista, Cape Verde
Fauna of Maio, Cape Verde